Porto Amboim Airport  is an airport serving Porto Amboim, a coastal city in Cuanza Sul Province, Angola.

The Porto Amboim non-directional beacon (Ident: PA) is on the field.

See also

 List of airports in Angola
 Transport in Angola

References

External links
 
OpenStreetMap - Porto Amboim
OurAirports - Porto Amboim

Airports in Angola